Agnieszka Rysiukiewicz (born 3 January 1978) is a Polish sprinter. She competed in the women's 4 × 100 metres relay at the 2000 Summer Olympics.

References

External links
 
 
 

1978 births
Living people
Athletes (track and field) at the 2000 Summer Olympics
Polish female sprinters
Olympic athletes of Poland
Place of birth missing (living people)
Universiade silver medalists for Poland
Universiade medalists in athletics (track and field)
Medalists at the 1999 Summer Universiade
Olympic female sprinters